Henry Rupert Wilhoit Jr. (February 11, 1935 – September 12, 2022) was a United States district judge of the United States District Court for the Eastern District of Kentucky.

Education and career
Born in Ashland, Kentucky, Wilhoit received a Bachelor of Laws from the University of Kentucky College of Law in 1960. He was in private practice in Grayson, Kentucky from 1960 to 1981, serving as the city attorney for Grayson from 1962 to 1966, and was the county attorney of Carter County, Kentucky from 1966 to 1970.

Federal judicial service
On August 11, 1981, Wilhoit was nominated by President Ronald Reagan to a seat on the United States District Court for the Eastern District of Kentucky vacated by Judge Howard David Hermansdorfer. Wilhoit was confirmed by the United States Senate on September 25, 1981, and received his commission on September 28, 1981. He served as chief judge from 1998 to 2000, assuming senior status on December 31, 2000. 

Wilhoit died on September 12, 2022, at the age of 87.

References

Sources
 

1935 births
2022 deaths
20th-century American judges
21st-century American judges
Judges of the United States District Court for the Eastern District of Kentucky
Kentucky Commonwealth's Attorneys
People from Ashland, Kentucky
People from Grayson, Kentucky
United States district court judges appointed by Ronald Reagan
University of Kentucky College of Law alumni